The following outline is provided as an overview and topical guide to space science:

Space science encompasses all of the scientific disciplines that involve space exploration and study natural phenomena and physical bodies occurring in outer space, such as space medicine and astrobiology.

Branches of space sciences

Astronomy 

See astronomical object for a list of specific types of entities which scientists study.  See Earth's location in the universe for an orientation.

 Subfields of astronomy:
 Astrophysics – branch of astronomy that deals with the physics of the universe, including the physical properties of celestial objects, as well as their interactions and behavior. Among the objects studied are galaxies, stars, planets, exoplanets, the interstellar medium and the cosmic microwave background; and the properties examined include luminosity, density, temperature, and chemical composition. The subdisciplines of theoretical astrophysics are:
 Computational astrophysics – The study of astrophysics using computational methods and tools to develop computational models.
 Plasma astrophysics – studies properties of plasma in outer space.
 Space physics – study of plasmas as they occur naturally in the Earth's upper atmosphere (aeronomy) and within the Solar System.
 Solar physics – Sun and its interaction with the remainder of the Solar System and interstellar space.
 Stellar astronomy – concerned with Star formation, physical properties, main sequence life span, variability, stellar evolution and extinction.
 Galactic astronomy – deals with the structure and components of our galaxy and of other galaxies.
 Extragalactic astronomy – study of objects (mainly galaxies) outside our galaxy, including Galaxy formation and evolution.
 Cosmology
 Physical cosmology – origin and evolution of the universe as a whole. The study of cosmology is theoretical astrophysics at its largest scale.
 Chemical cosmology - study of the chemical composition of matter in the universe and the processes that led to those compositions.
 Quantum cosmology – the study of cosmology through the use of quantum field theory to explain phenomena general relativity cannot due to limitations in its framework.
 Planetary Science – study of planets, moons, and planetary systems.
 Atmospheric science – study of atmospheres and weather.
 Planetary geology
 Planetary oceanography
 Exoplanetology – various planets outside of the Solar System
 Astrochemistry – studies the abundance and reactions of molecules in the Universe, and their interaction with radiation.

 Interdisciplinary studies of astronomy:
 Astrobiology – studies the advent and evolution of biological systems in the universe.
 Space biology – studies to build a better understanding of how spaceflight affects living systems in spacecraft, or in ground-based experiments that mimic aspects of spaceflight
 Space chemistry – Reactions of elements to form more complex compounds, such as amino acids, are key to the study of chemistry in space.
 Astrobotany – Sub-discipline of botany that is the study of plants in space environments.
 Archaeoastronomy – studies ancient or traditional astronomies in their cultural context, utilizing archaeological and anthropological evidence.
 Space archaeology – the study of human artifacts in outer space
 Forensic astronomy – the use of astronomy, the scientific study of celestial objects, to determine the appearance of the sky at specific times in the past.

 Techniques used in astronomical research:
 Theoretical astronomy – mathematical modelling of celestial entities and phenomena
 Astrometry – study of the position of objects in the sky and their changes of position. Defines the system of coordinates used and the kinematics of objects in our galaxy.
 Photometry – study of how bright celestial objects are when passed through different filters
 Spectroscopy – study of the spectra of astronomical objects
 Observational astronomy – practice of observing celestial objects by using telescopes and other astronomical apparatus. Observatories on the ground as well as space observatories take measurements of celestial entities and phenomena. It is concerned with recording data. The subdisciplines of observational astronomy are generally made by the specifications of the detectors: 
 Radio astronomy –  >300 µm
 Submillimetre astronomy – 200 µm to 1 mm
 Infrared astronomy – 0.7–350 µm
 Optical astronomy – 380–750 nm
 Ultraviolet astronomy – 10–320 nm
 High-energy astronomy
 X-ray astronomy – 0.01–10 nm
 Gamma-ray astronomy – <0.01 nm
 Neutrino astronomy – Neutrinos
 Gravitational wave astronomy – Gravitons

Astronautics 

The science and engineering of spacefaring and spaceflight, a subset of Aerospace engineering (which includes atmospheric flight)

 Space technology is technology for use in outer space, in travel or other activities beyond Earth's atmosphere, for purposes such as spaceflight, space exploration, and Earth observation.
Spaceflight
 Human spaceflight
 Outline of space exploration
 Space architecture
 Life-support system
 Space station
 Space Habitation Module

 Life in space
 Bioastronautics
 Animals in space
 Microorganisms tested in outer space
 Plants in space
 Humans in space
 Women in space
 Effect of spaceflight on the human body
 Sleep in space
 Food in space
 Medicine in space
 Neuroscience in space
 Religion in space
 Christmas on the International Space Station
 Sex in space
 Writing in space

See also

References

External links

Institute of Space Technology, Pakistan
Space Sciences @ NASA 
Space Sciences @ ESA 
INDIAN INSTITUTE OF SPACE SCIENCE AND TECHNOLOGY
Space Sciences Institute 
Space Science & Technology, (Persian) an Iranian nongovernmental group who writes scientific articles about Space Science & Technology

space science
space science
space science
space science